Anari (Ana Rita Alberdi) (born in 1970 in Azkoitia, Gipuzkoa) is a Basque singer-songwriter. She released her first album in 1997 and has established herself as an important reference point in the Basque music scene. She has often been compared with other female singers or songwriters from English-speaking countries, such as PJ Harvey and Cat Power, due to the intricate nature of her compositions and her intense live performances.

In 2006, she started working at a secondary school in Ordizia, teaching linguistics, Hispanic literature, and philosophy.

Discography

Albums 
 Anari (Esan Ozenki, 1997). CD.
 Habiak (Esan Ozenki, 2000). CD.
 Anari ta Petti (Metak, 2003). CD.
 Zebra (Metak, 2005). CD.
 Anari Kafe Antzokian Zuzenean (Bidehuts, 2008). CD.
 Irla izan (Bidehuts, 2009). CD.
 Zure aurrekari penalak (Bidehuts, 2015). CD.
 Epilogo bat (Bidehuts, 2016). CD.

References

Sources 
 Interview with Anari in Rockdelux, number 237, February 2006, pp 32–33

1970 births
Living people
Basque-language singers
Basque musicians
Spanish singer-songwriters
21st-century Spanish singers
21st-century Spanish women singers
People from Azkoitia